is a former Japanese football player.

Playing career
Fukudome was born in Kumamoto Prefecture on June 26, 1978. After graduating from high school, he joined the J1 League club Kyoto Purple Sanga in 1997. However he did not play in any matches until 1998. In 1999, he moved to the newly promoted J2 League club, Sagan Tosu with Haruhiko Sato. He played many matches as forward until 2001. However, he did not play in any matches in 2002 and retired at the end of the 2002 season.

Club statistics

References

External links

kyotosangadc

1978 births
Living people
Association football people from Kumamoto Prefecture
Japanese footballers
J1 League players
J2 League players
Kyoto Sanga FC players
Sagan Tosu players
Association football forwards